The Philadelphia Trumpet is a cost-free magazine published by the Philadelphia Church of God, also available online. The first issue appeared in February 1990. It is intended to continue preaching the doctrines of Herbert W. Armstrong's "Plain Truth" magazine after Armstrong's death in 1986. It is still being published today. The magazine primarily runs articles about current events, societal commentary, and Bible-based self-help articles, which often source Biblical writing as prophecies relating to world events.

The magazine's editor-in-chief Gerald Flurry, Pastor General of the PCG, characterizes the magazine as the successor to the Worldwide Church of God's The Plain Truth magazine, when under the direction of Herbert W. Armstrong. The magazine's advertisements consist of free-of-charge offer campaigns for PCG books, booklets and other materials. The publication is heavily right-wing, expressing opinions wanting to return Donald Trump to office, and disparaging the Democratic Party, especially Barack Obama.

Mission statement 
The Philadelphia Church of God considers the publication to be a matter of public interest, quoted as saying it "deals with matters of social, family and environmental concern. It includes articles on international news, politics, philosophy, religion and education, especially where these have a bearing on the quality of life."

The Philadelphia Trumpet is the PCoG's primary means of disseminating their beliefs, including current events according to their interpretation of Bible prophecy. Marketed as a free news magazine, they use it to promote their books and booklets and ultimately, to recruit members into their church.

Subscription fee 
It is primarily used to recruit new members to their Church, the magazine itself along with literature promoted within each issue is offered free of charge. It is paid for by tithes and offerings of members of the Philadelphia Church of God and their co-workers".  All PCG members are required to pay ten percent of their income to the church.

Notes

References

External links
 copies of The Plain Truth 1934-1986 and other Armstrong literature

1990 establishments in Oklahoma
Online magazines published in the United States
Religious magazines published in the United States
Christian magazines
Church of God (Armstrong)
Free magazines
Magazines established in 1990
Magazines published in Oklahoma
Ten times annually magazines